

The Maiden's Tower, also known as Leander's Tower (Tower of Leandros) since the medieval Byzantine period, is a tower on a small islet at the southern entrance of the Bosphorus strait,  from the coast of Üsküdar in Istanbul, Turkey.

The tower appeared on the reverse of the Turkish 10 lira banknote from 1966 to 1981.

History
After the naval victory at Cyzicus, in 408 BC the Athenian general Alcibiades probably built a custom station for ships coming from the Black Sea on a small rock in front of Chrysopolis (today's Üsküdar). 

In 1110 Byzantine Emperor Alexius Comnenus built a wooden tower protected by a stone wall. From the tower an iron chain stretched across to another tower erected on the European shore, at the quarter of Mangana in Constantinople. The islet was then connected to the Asiatic shore through a defense wall, whose underwater remains are still visible. During the Ottoman conquest of Constantinople in 1453, the tower held a Byzantine garrison commanded by the Venetian Gabriele Trevisano. Subsequently, the structure was used as a watchtower by the Ottoman Turks during the reign of sultan Mehmed the Conqueror.

The tower was destroyed during the earthquake of 1509, rebuilt, and then burned down in 1721. Reconstruction was ordered by the grand vizier Damad Ibrahim Pasha and the new building was used as a lighthouse; the surrounding walls were repaired in 1731 and 1734. Finally in 1763 the tower was reconstructed in more durable stone. From 1829 it was used as a quarantine station before being restored again by Sultan Mahmud II in 1832. In 1945 it was the turn of the harbour authority to patch it up. Then in 1998 it was restored again, a short time before appearing in the James Bond movie The World Is Not Enough. 

After the 17 August 1999 earthquake and tsunami in  the Sea of Marmara steel supports were added to the tower to strengthen it.  The interior was converted into a café and restaurant, with views of the former Roman, Byzantine and Ottoman capital at Sarayburnu. Private boats ply back and forth between the tower and the shore throughout the day.

In 2021 work on restoring the tower yet again started. Once it is completed there may no longer be a restaurant inside it.

Origin of the name
There are several stories about the tower's name. According to one story, an oracle prophesied that the emperor's much beloved daughter would be killed by a venomous snake on her 18th birthday. In an effort to protect her, the emperor had the tower built in the Bosphorus and had her locked there to keep her away from any snakes. Her only regular visitor was her father. On her 18th birthday, the emperor brought her a basket of exotic fruits as a gift, delighted that he had been able to thwart the prophecy. However, an asp that had been hiding among the fruit bit the princess who died in her father's arms, just as the oracle had predicted, hence the name Maiden's Tower.

The alternative name Leander's Tower (Greek: Τουρ δε Λέανδρος; Latin: Tour de Léandros) comes from the Greek myth of Hero and Leander. Hero was a priestess of Aphrodite who lived in a tower at Sestos, at the edge of the Hellespont (Dardanelles). Leander (Leandros), a young man from Abydos on the other side of the strait, fell in love with her and would swim across the Hellespont every night to be with her. Hero would light a lamp at the top of her tower to guide his way. Succumbing to Leander's pleas, and to his argument that Aphrodite, the goddess of love, would scorn the worship of a virgin, Hero allowed him to make love to her throughout the warm summer. But one stormy winter night, the waves buffeted Leander in the water. The wind blew out Hero's light, and Leander lost his way and was drowned. Hero threw herself from the tower in grief and died as well. Due to the vicinity and similarity between the Dardanelles and the Bosphorus, Leander's story was mistakenly attributed to the tower.

In popular culture
Tower is featured in a  romantic scene of Turkish TV series Kördügün (“Intersection”), Season 2, Episode 6.
The tower featured in the James Bond film The World Is Not Enough. It was also visible in the background in the 1963 Bond film From Russia with Love.
The tower was also used in the film Hitman.
The tower was a point on the American reality game show The Amazing Race 7.
The tower featured heavily in the Turkish drama programme Kurtlar Vadisi.
The tower appeared  in the Turkish drama programme Kırgın Çiçekler.
The tower was featured in the game Assassin's Creed: Revelations where it is the location of one Masyaf key that the playable character must collect to complete the game.
The tower featured prominently in the logo for Istanbul's unsuccessful bid for the 2020 Summer Olympics.
The tower also featured in the Turkish drama programme Erkenci Kuş (Early Bird).
The tower appeared in sixth episode of the Turkish drama programme Zengin Kız Fakir Oğlan (Rich Girl, Poor Boy).

See also

 List of lighthouses in Turkey
 List of columns and towers in Istanbul

References and notes

Sources

External links

 Virtual tour of Maiden's Tower (3D panoramas)
 Detailed History and Legends of Maiden's Tower. 
 Directorate General of Coastal Safety
 Nomad's Guide to Turkey

Buildings and structures completed in 1110
Towers completed in the 12th century
Lighthouses completed in the 12th century
Constantinople
Bosphorus
Restaurants in Istanbul
Redevelopment projects in Istanbul
Buildings and structures in Istanbul
Tourist attractions in Istanbul
Landmarks in Turkey
Lighthouses in Istanbul
Towers in Turkey
Lighthouses completed in 1763